Alvin Sanders is an American-Canadian voice actor and voice director. He currently sits on the Union of BC Performers executive board.

Filmography

Animated

Anime roles
Dragon Ball Z – Mr Popo, Additional Voices (1996–1997)
 Dragon Ball Z the Movie: The Tree of Might – Cacao
Dragon Warrior – Baharata
Escaflowne – Additional Voices
Funky Fables – Various Characters
Hello Carbot – Guard
InuYasha – Manten
Master Keaton – Eugen Hart
Night Warriors: Darkstalkers' Revenge – Jon Talbain
Transformers: Armada – Demolishor
Transformers: Energon – Demolishor

Non-anime roles
 Camp Candy – Additional Voices
 Captain N: The Game Master – Additional Voices
 Class of the Titans – David Johnson
 Exosquad – Avery F. Butler
 Fantastic Four: World's Greatest Heroes – Puppet Master
 Gadget and the Gadgetinis – General Sir
 G.I. Joe – Static Line, Stretcher
 Hurricanes – Additional Voices
 Krypto the Superdog – Eyepatch Shark, Dog Sergeant, Garbage Man, Angry Snowman, Happy Snowman
 Littlest Pet Shop – Additional Voices
 Mummies Alive! – Additional Voices
 My Little Pony: Friendship Is Magic – Flutterguy ("Filli Vanilli"), King Sombra ("The Beginning of the End: Parts 1 and 2")
 The New Adventures of He-Man – Flogg, Tuskador
 The Puzzle Club Christmas Mystery
 RoboCop: Alpha Commando – Additional Voices
 Sherlock Holmes in the 22nd Century – Additional Voices
 Skysurfer Strike Force – Cybron, Nate James/Air Enforcer
 Street Sharks – Additional Voices
 X-Men: Evolution – Mirambo, Mr. Sefton
 Yvon of the Yukon – Jackie Styles

Live-action

Television
 Legends of Tomorrow – Buddy (in "The Final Frame")
 Dead Like Me – Milkman ("Nighthawks")
 Resident Alien – Lewis Thompson
 Riverdale – Pop Tate
 Stargate SG-1 – Fred ("Holiday")

Movies
 The Baby Dance – Security Officer
 Cats & Dogs – Mason Employee
 Door to Door – Shoeshine Boy
 Hot Rod – Furious Boss
 Life-Size – Guard
 Love, Guaranteed – Jerome
 Our Shining Moment – Mr. Rahill
 Romeo Must Die – Calvin the Barber
 Stealing Christmas – Cook at Dave's Cafe
 Santa Hunters – Grandpa

Staff work
 Captain N: The Game Master – Recording Assistant
 Funky Fables – Additional Director
 Sugar and Spice: Heidi  and Sugar & Spice: Alice in Wonderland  (both 1991) – Additional Director

References

External links
 

Living people
African-American male actors
American expatriates in Canada
American male voice actors
American voice directors
Black Canadian male actors
Canadian male voice actors
Canadian voice directors
Canadian people of African-American descent
20th-century African-American people
Year of birth missing (living people)